Abdulla Tafa (27 July 1947 – 1 July 2015) was an Albanian art critic and academic researcher. He was the author of many essays, articles and books dedicated to famous Albanian artists such as the painter Ibrahim Kodra and composer Mustafa Krantja. Tafa was also a member of the European Academy of Sciences and Arts.

See also 
 Modern Albanian art

References 

 bksh.al

External links 
 botimeshqip.com
 albanianscreen.tv

1947 births
Albanian art critics
Critical rationalists
Academics from Kavajë
Albanian essayists
Albanian biographers
Members of the European Academy of Sciences and Arts
20th-century biographers
21st-century biographers
2015 deaths
20th-century essayists
21st-century essayists